Richard Newton Holwill (born October 9, 1945 Shreveport, Louisiana) served as the American Ambassador Extraordinary and Plenipotentiary to Ecuador for 16 months from July 1988 until November 1989, replacing Fernando Enrique Rondon.  He had been Deputy Assistant Secretary for Inter-American Affairs at the Department of State since 1983.

Holwill graduated from Louisiana State University (B.A., 1968) and served in the United States Marine Corps from 1969 until 1971.

Career
Holwill has held several positions outside of the federal government including being a member of the Board of Directors of the Panama Canal Commission, vice president of government information for The Heritage Foundation, vice president of Energy Decisions, Inc. as well as consultant and managing editor of Energy Decisions and a White House correspondent for National Public Radio.

References

1945 births
Louisiana State University alumni
20th-century American diplomats
Ambassadors of the United States to Ecuador
United States Foreign Service personnel
People from Shreveport, Louisiana
NPR personalities
The Heritage Foundation
Living people